Gothic is an inflected language, and as such its nouns, pronouns, and adjectives must be declined in order to serve a grammatical function. A set of declined forms of the same word pattern is called a declension. There are five grammatical cases in Gothic with a few traces of an old sixth instrumental case.

Grammatical cases
A complete declension consists of five grammatical cases.

Description of cases
 The nominative case, which is used to express the subject of a statement. It is also used with copulative verbs.
 The vocative case, which is used to address someone or something in direct speech. This case is indicated in English by intonation or punctuation, e.g. "Mary is going to the store" ("Mary" is nominative) compared to "Mary, are you going to the store?"  or "Mary!" ("Mary" is vocative).
 The accusative case, which expresses the direct object of a verb. English does not have a distinct accusative case, though a small number of pronouns show different forms when they appear as direct or indirect object (e.g. he becoming him, she becoming her)
 The genitive case, which expresses possession, measurement, or source. The English possessive suffix enclitic "–'s" is derived from an earlier genitive case and is related to the common Gothic genitive suffix "-s", though its use in English is much more limited (non-possessive uses of the genitive case in Gothic are often translated in English using the word "of").
 The dative case, which expresses the recipient of an action, the indirect object of a verb. In English, the indirect object is generally expressed by word order (e.g. I gave Mary the book; she bought me lunch) or by prepositions such as to or for (I gave the book to Mary; she bought lunch for me).
 The instrumental case, which is used to express the place in or on which, or the time at which, an action is performed. The instrumental case only survives in a few preposition forms in Gothic.

Order of cases
Gothic language grammars often follow the common NOM-ACC-GEN-DAT order used for the Germanic languages.  VOC is usually attached to the same line as ACC as a combined VOC-ACC, but if not, it may be placed between NOM and ACC (as in Wright's "Grammar of the Gothic Language").

Short vs. long stems
An important distinction in many of the declension classes below is the difference between "short" and "long" stems.  Frequently declension classes are divided into two subclasses, one for short-stemmed nouns and one for long-stemmed nouns.

A short stem contains:
Either a short vowel followed by at most a single consonant (consonants at the beginning of an ending do not count),
Or a long vowel or diphthong with no following consonant (other than possibly a consonant at the beginning of an ending),

A long stem is all other types of stems:
Either a long vowel or diphthong followed by at least a single consonant (not counting consonants at the beginning of an ending),
Or a short vowel followed by at least two consonants (same caveat concerning consonants at the beginning of an ending),
Or a word whose root (minus any prefixes and suffixes) is more than one syllable in length, e.g.  "counsellor", with root  and  being the long-stemmed -ja declension ending.

Strong noun declensions

The -a declension
This declension has as counterparts the second declension (us/um) of Latin, and the omicron declension (os/on) of Greek. It contains masculine and neuter nouns.

A varied set of nouns have two stems, one occurring with endings that are null or begin with a consonant (the nominative, accusative and vocative singular) and another that occurs with endings beginning with a vowel (all but the previously listed forms).

One common situation leading to two-stem nouns is the automatic devoicing of voiced fricatives at (or near) the end of a word, e.g.:

Stem ending in f changes in b. See table with further explanation below.

Stem ending in short vowel + r does not receive s (-z) in the nominative case.

Stem ending in -z  does not lose the z in its nominative case. This has to do with the other cases and their pronounceability.

The Gothic language lost its -z as it changed into a -s in many words,  though it remained when it is protected by a particle. For example: wileiz-u? (wilt thou). 

More information about the exceptions in the -a declension can be found at page 82, §175 of Grammar of the Gothic Language written by Joseph Wright. (Link can be found at the bottom.)

Other nouns with two stems are:
masculine  "servant" (accusative singular  but genitive singular , nominative plural , etc.)
neuter  "knee" (accusative singular  but genitive singular , nominative plural , etc.);
neuter  "tree" (forms parallel to ).

The -ja declension
This declension is really just the -a declension with a j immediately preceding.  However, due to various sound laws, a new declension subcategory has arisen that does not exactly follow the form of the plain -a declension.  Similar developments occurred in Greek and the Slavic languages, among others.

This declension has as counterparts the second declension nouns in (-ius/-ium) of Latin.  The counterparts in Greek are some second declension nouns in (-ios/-ion), as well as many that show effects of palatalization (e.g., -zdos < *-gyos or *-dyos; -llos < *-lyos; -ptos < -*pyos; -ssos or -ttos < -*tyos; -airos/-eiros/-oiros < *-aryos/-eryos/-oryos; -ainos/-einos/-oinos < *-anyos/enyos/onyos; etc., and similarly for neuter nouns in -ion or *-yon).  It contains masculine and neuter nouns.

The masculine nouns have a distinction between short- and long-stemmed nouns, as described above. Neuters, however, have merged the two types in favor of the short-stem endings. Properly, there should be a distinction in the genitive singular between short-stem -jis and long-stem -eis, as for the masculine nouns, but -jis has mostly taken over. For a few nouns, however, both forms can be used, as in genitive  or  "of service",  or  "of peace", from neuter nouns  "service" and  "peace", respectively.

Note that the neuters in this declension can be said to follow the two-stem pattern (e.g. kuni vs. kunj-) described above for a-stems.  A few neuters in this declension follow the same overall pattern but have additional vowel changes between the stems:
 "region, district" (genitive )
 "hay" (genitive )
 "deed, work" (genitive )

The -ō declension
This declension counterparts the first declension (a) of Latin, and the alpha declension (a/as) of Greek. It contains feminine nouns.

The -jō declension
Nouns ending in -jō that have a short stem (see discussion above) behave identically to normal -ō stems, e.g.  "strife",  "relationship",  "truth".  However, long-stemmed nouns in -jō have a different nominative singular ending in -i:

Note that in this particular case the "long-stem" declension includes nouns with a long vowel or diphthong and no following consonant.  In addition, these nouns have a different stem in the nominative singular from all other cases:
 (genitive ) "maiden"
 (genitive ) "maidservant"

The -i declension
This declension counterparts the vowel stems of the third declension (is) of Latin, and the third declension of Greek. It contains masculine and feminine nouns.  Note that masculine nouns have become identical to -a stem nouns in the singular, while feminine nouns have preserved the original declension.

Similar to the situation with -a stems, some nouns have a different stem in the nominative and accusative singular than in other cases:

 (acc. , gen. ) "fall", masc.
 (acc. , gen. ) "child, son", masc.
 (acc. , gen. ) "corpse", masc.
 (gen. ) "bridegroom", masc.; similarly  "sacrifice",  "place"
 (acc. , gen. ) "resurrection", fem.
 (gen. ) "labor", fem.; similarly  "deed",  "joy"

Some additional complications:
 "village" (fem.) is declined like a feminine -i stem in the singular, but like an -ō stem in the plural.
Feminine abstract -i stems in -eins are declined partly like -ō stems in the plural:

The -u declension
This declension counterparts the fourth declension (us) of Latin and parts of the third declension of Greek (cf. πῆχυς). It contains nouns of all genders. "property" is a neuter -u stem, and like all neuters from the u stem it lacks a plural. "cider, fruit wine" is attested only in the accusative singular and without any context to infer its gender, so it may have been masculine or neuter.

Weak noun declensions (n-stems)
The an, on and in declensions constitute a Germanic word derivation, which is also used for adjectives in the weak form marking definiteness. The declension loosely parallels the Latin nouns in -ō, genitive -ōnis/-inis, which shares the same Indo-European declensional origin (the Greek descendant being the more regularized -ōn, -onos class).

The -an declension

Masculines and neuters belong to this declension.

There are a few neuter irregularities:

The -ōn declension

This declension is the feminine counterpart of the an declension.

The -ein declension

This declension contains abstract feminines only.

Minor noun declensions

The -r declension

A few family nouns inherited from Proto-Indo-European have a very archaic declension. Feminines and masculines have identical forms.

Inflected thus are also  m., "brother",  m., "father",  f., "daughter".

The -nd declension

These nouns are old present participles, corresponding to nouns in -nt in Latin and Greek.

The root nouns
These nouns correspond to the consonant declensions in Latin and Greek (in both cases, part of the third declension).  Only traces of masculines are extant, but feminines are fairly well attested.

, dat. pl. ); and  "witness" (gen. sg., dat. pl. not attested).

There are nine feminine nouns attested.  Note the following irregularities:
 "measure" (gen. sg. )
 "night" (dat. pl. , formed after dat. pl.  "days")
 "feast" and  "thing", also declined as i-stems.
The other five feminine nouns are  "temple",  "city",  "breast",  "milk", and  "racecourse".

Adjectives
Adjectives in Gothic, as in the other Germanic languages, can be declined according to two different paradigms, commonly called "strong" and "weak".  This represents a significant innovation in Germanic, although a similar development has taken place in the Baltic and Slavic languages.

Adjectives in Proto-Indo-European -- as is still the case in Latin, Greek, and most other daughters—are declined in exactly the same way as nouns.  Germanic "strong" adjectives, however, take many of their endings from the declension of pronouns. These pronominal endings are likely to have entered the adjective inflection in the Germanic proto-language, via the inflection of possessive adjectives and other "pronominal" word classes, as evidenced by the variation between the bare stem and -ata in the neuter nominative and accusative singular of Gothic adjectives and possessive pronouns.   "Weak" adjectives take the endings of -n stem nouns, regardless of the underlying stem class of the adjective.

In general, weak adjectival endings are used when the adjective is accompanied by a definite article, and strong endings are used in other situations. However, weak endings are occasionally used in the absence of a definite article, and cause the associated noun to have the same semantics as if a definite article were present. Weak adjectives are also used when the associated noun is in the vocative case. In addition, some adjectives are always declined weak or strong, regardless of any accompanying articles.

The strong -a declension

The strong -ja declension

Similar to the situation with nouns, the ja-stem adjectives are divided into two subtypes, depending on whether the stem is short or long.

Short-stemmed -ja declension

This declension has only the following extant adjectives:  "other",  "free" (stem , see below),  "perfect",  "willing",  "middle",  "new",  "true",  "evil-doing", and  "lawless".
Notes about the above adjectives:
 "free" has the stem  outside of the nominative masculine singular and presumably also the short-form nominative and accusative neuter singular and genitive masculine and neuter singular, although apparently it is unattested in those forms.
 "perfect" and  "evil-doing" should end in –taui in the short-form nominative and accusative neuter singular, although apparently it is unattested in those forms.
Similarly,  "new" should have  as its short-form nominative and accusative neuter singular, although apparently it is unattested in those forms.

Long-stemmed –ja declension

This declension is built out of long-stemmed -ja masculine and neuter nouns and long-stemmed -jō feminine nouns.

This declension has only five extant adjectives:  "astray",  "old",  "old",  "wild", and  "sweet". None of these adjectives are extent in any genitive singular forms, and hence the forms given above are reconstructions based on the behavior of the corresponding nouns.
The –eis ending is the phonologically expected ending, and masculines genitive singulars use this ending.
Neuter genitive singulars of long-stem nouns, on the other hand, generally use –jis, by analogy with short-stem neuter nouns.
However, some long-stem neuter nouns use both the (phonologically regular) –eis and the (analogically replaced) –jis, as in genitive  or  "of service",  or  "of peace".
Given that masculine and neuter adjectives have the same genitive and dative forms in all other types of adjectives, the influence of the masculine on the neuter is expected to be very strong.  This is why the most likely form is assumed to be the one in –eis, despite the impact of the corresponding neuter nouns.

The strong -i declension
Adjectives of this class have replaced most forms with forms taken from the -ja declension.  Only the nominative singular, the neuter accusative singular and the masculine and neuter genitive singular have genuine -i stem forms.

The following adjectives of this type are extant (along with a few others):  "hidden",  "visible",  "pleasant",  "desert",  "useful",  "well-behaved",  "common",  "clean",  "kind",  "beautiful",  "clear",  "sweet".

The strong -u declension
Similarly to -i stem adjectives, -u stem adjectives have replaced most forms with those taken from the -ja declension.

The following adjectives of this type are extant:  "narrow",  "difficult",  "hard",  "soft",  "heavy",  "ready",  "gentle",  "late",  "steadfast",  "twelve years old",  "withered",  "soft".

The weak declension

Weak adjectival endings are taken from the corresponding endings of masculine, feminine and neuter n-stems, e.g. masculine  "man", feminine  "tongue", neuter  "heart".  All adjectives have the same endings, regardless of the underlying stem class of the adjective.  The only difference is that ja-stems, i-stems and u-stems have a -j- at the end of the stem, e.g. masculine singular nominative weak  "new",  "wild",  "clean",  "hard", corresponding to the strong forms  (short ja-stem),  (long ja-stem),  (i-stem),  (u-stem).

Pronouns

Personal pronouns

Possessive pronouns

Gothic possessive pronouns are formed by adding the above shown suffixes to the genitive ("possessor") form of the given personal pronoun. Reflexive pronouns are inflected similarly. The form used outside of possession is derived from the nominative feminine singular. The possessor suffixes are the same in the possessee plural.  "my, mine" and  "our, ours" are shown here for example, but others can apply.

Demonstrative pronouns

Compound forms with the suffix -(u)h meaning "this, these; that/ those" and with -ei creating relative pronouns also exist. The suffix -ei can also be added to first and second person pronouns to create first and second person relatives. All compound forms drop the "u" in -uh after a vowel and change word-final -s to a -z if the next letter is a vowel.

Interrogative pronouns

The plural form  (masculine accusative) occurs once as part of the indefinite pronoun  "each, every"; the other plurals are reconstructed. Hwas is declined irregular, but shares similar forms with sa, the others are declined mostly like strong (j)a-stem adjectives. Hwaþar is only extant in the nominative masculine singular and neuter singular nominative/ accusative; the other forms are reconstructed.

The following additional pronouns exist, all declined strong as a-stems:
 "what sort of"
 (stem ) "how great"
 "such"
 (stem ) "so great"

Indefinite pronouns

Three indefinite pronouns are formed by appending -uh "and" to the interrogative pronouns  "who, what",  "which (of many)", and  "which of two"; compare the analogously formed Latin pronoun  "each", formed from  "who" and  "and".  Both  and  mean "each, every";  means "each of two".

Before -uh, -s appears in the original form of -z-, and after long vowels and stressed short vowels, the u of -uh is elided. Of , only a single form is extant, the dative singular , occurring in the compound form  "to each one of two".

The plural form  (masculine accusative) occurs once, in the expression  "he sent them forth two and two".

Additional pronominal forms are

 "every one"
The corresponding neuter form is  "whatever", extant only in the accusative singular.

 "some, a certain", declined as an -a stem with an associated genitive plural object.
 "the one ... the other", in plural "some ... and others". -uh is generally attached to the second form and sometimes the first, as in nominative plural .
"not who and not".  occurs only in the nominative masculine singular.

Plain ƕas can be used indefinitely to mean "anyone, anything".
Plain áins can be used indefinitely to mean "one, a certain one".

Numbers

Hund and þūsundi can mean either "100" and "1000" or "120" and "1200", depending on scale. Táihuntēhund always means "100". Áins has two different ordinals.

Numbers below 20 behave as adjectives, whereas those starting at 20 behave as nouns and govern the genitive case of an associated object, e.g. dagē fidwōr tiguns "for forty days", fimf þūsundjōs waírē "five thousand men", miþ twáim tigum þūsundjō mannē "with twenty thousand men". Ordinal numbers are always adjectives. 

Plural forms of áins meaning "some" also occur, otherwise the numbers are always declined as plural.

Higher numbers from fidwōr "four" through niuntaíhun "nineteen" are normally undeclined, but can be declined as -i stems, e.g. dative fidwōrim, genitive *fidwōrē.

Decades sibuntēhund "seventy", ahtáutēhund "eighty", niuntēhund "ninety" and taíhuntēhund/taíhuntaíhund "one hundred" are normally undeclined, but genitive niuntēhundis "of ninety" occurs.

A handful of numerals are declined irregularly, shown below:

Notes:
twái and þreis are declined entirely irregularly.
fruma is declined weak like blinda "blind" except that the feminine is declined according to the ei-stems like managei "multitude", e.g. feminine nominative frumei.
anþar has nominative masculine and neuter anþar (no -ata form exists), and otherwise is declined a strong a-stem.

Other numerals
"Both" is bái or bajōþs, of which the following forms are extant:

The extant forms of  match the corresponding forms of  "two", and evidence from other Germanic languages, e.g. Old English, indicates that all forms are constructed in this fashion.

Distributive numerals answer the question "how many at a time?".  The isolated form  "two each" exists, declined as a plural strong adjective. Otherwise, distributive numerals are expressed using prepositional phrases, e.g.  "by twos or at most by threes";  "by fifties in each (company)";  "he sent them forth two and two".

Multiplicative numerals answer the question "how many times more?" and are formed by adding the adjectival stem  to the stem of the corresponding cardinal.  Extant are  "onefold, simple";  "fourfold" (note, not );  "hundredfold";  "manifold".

Numeral adverbs answer the question "how often?" or "how many times?".  They are formed by combining the cardinal or ordinal with the noun  "time" (lit. "a going"), and placing the result in the dative case:  "once";  "a second time";  "twice";  "thrice";  "five times";  "seven times".  Compare Old English  "once",  "five times".

See also 
 Gothic language
 Grammar of the Gothic Language
 Proto-Indo-European noun:
 Ancient Greek grammar
 Latin declension
 Sanskrit nouns

Notes

References
 
 

Declension
Declension